The Third International Electric Tramway and Railway Exhibition was held in the Royal Agricultural Hall, Islington, London from 3 July 1905 to 14 July 1905

It was a successor event to the Second International Tramways and Light Railways Exhibition held in 1902.

The Third International Electric Tramway and Railway Exhibition was opened on 3 July 1905 by Frederick Stanley, 16th Earl of Derby. It was organised by Tramway and Railway World. There were over 150 exhibitors, including the major suppliers of tramway and light railway equipment were present, including:
Brush Electrical Engineering Company
Bruce Peebles & Co. Ltd.
Dick, Kerr & Co.

References

1905 in the United Kingdom
Tram transport in the United Kingdom
Trade fairs in the United Kingdom